Octavio Antonio Fernández Castro (June 30, 1962 – February 16, 2020), better known as Tony Fernández, was a Dominican baseball player who played as a shortstop in Major League Baseball (MLB) for seven teams from 1983 to 2001, most notably the Toronto Blue Jays. A five-time All-Star, Fernández was known for his defensive skills, winning four consecutive Gold Glove Awards (1986–1989). He batted over .300 four times, led the major leagues with 17 triples in 1990, collected 30 doubles six times and 20 stolen bases seven times. He also led American League shortstops in assists three times, and in putouts and fielding average twice each. After moving to the National League in a blockbuster trade following the 1990 season, he returned to the Blue Jays in a mid-season trade in 1993, and played a major role in helping the club repeat as World Series champions, batting .333 with nine runs batted in during the series.

Early life
Fernández was born in San Pedro de Macorís, Dominican Republic. He was first scouted by the Toronto Blue Jays' Latin America scout Epy Guerrero and was signed as an undrafted free agent in 1979.

Career
Promoted to the Blue Jays in 1983, Fernández became the team's full-time shortstop in 1985,  and contributed significantly to the team winning its first division title that year. Fernández continued to star for the Jays for several years afterwards. His 213 hits in 1986 were, at the time, a major league single-season record for a shortstop.

Before the 1991 season, Fernández was traded to the San Diego Padres in a deal that also sent Jays star Fred McGriff to San Diego in exchange for Roberto Alomar and Joe Carter.  Fernández played for San Diego for two years. After the 1992 season, the Padres traded him to the New York Mets for D. J. Dozier, Wally Whitehurst, and a player to be named later. After a disappointing start to the 1993 season, the Mets traded him back to the Blue Jays for Darrin Jackson. He played well for the remainder of the season and was instrumental in helping the Blue Jays win the 1993 World Series against the Philadelphia Phillies. In that World Series, Fernández drove in nine runs,  a record for a shortstop.

Before the 1995 season, Fernández signed a two-year contract with the New York Yankees. It was because of an injury early in the season to Fernández that Derek Jeter was called up to the major leagues for the first time. Fernández injured his elbow during spring training in 1996, and missed the entire season.

Fernández signed with the Cleveland Indians for the 1997 season. Thanks in large part to his own game-winning home run against Baltimore in the American League Championship Series—the only 1–0 game in MLB postseason history with an extra-innings home run—he played in the 1997 World Series with the Indians. In Game 7 of the World Series against the Florida Marlins, Fernández hit a two-run single in the top of the third inning for the Indians' only runs of the game, and was in position to be credited with the Series-winning hit for Cleveland, had they won the game. However, in the bottom of the 11th inning, Fernández committed an error on a potential double play ball while playing at second base, and the eventual World Series-winning run was put on base as a result.

In 1998, he rejoined the Blue Jays, and revitalized his hitting, batting over .300 in two seasons there. In 2000, Fernández played for the Seibu Lions in Japan before returning to the majors the following year. When he returned in 2001, he briefly played for the Milwaukee Brewers but returned to Toronto late in the season, and retired at its conclusion.

A very thin man, Fernández had a tilted, wavering batting stance that made it appear as if he might not be strong enough to hold his bat. From early in his career he carried a scar on his right cheek from a pitched ball. Fernández was a noted fitness fanatic.

Early in his career, Fernández was well known for his exceptional defensive skills at shortstop, and was described by Ivan Maisel in a Sports Illustrated article as having "the range of a Texas cattleman". He was especially famous for leaping into the air while simultaneously making an underhanded throw to first base, on balls hit far to his right.

Fernández was awarded four consecutive Gold Glove Awards for his defense, from 1986 to 1989. Fernández was also named to five All-Star teams. He finished his career with a .288 batting average in 2,158 games played, and batted .327 in postseason play.  Fernandez hit for the cycle as a New York Yankee on September 3, 1995, against the Oakland Athletics. He set a nine-year record for shortstops with a .992 fielding percentage in 1989, while still holding the single-season fielding percentage record for third basemen with .991 in 1994.

On October 17, 2016, Fernandez was inducted into the Ontario Sports Hall of Fame at the Sheraton Centre Toronto Hotel, where he thanked the fans in Toronto, Ontario and in Canada for embracing him.

Illness and death
Fernández announced in 2017 he had been diagnosed with polycystic kidney disease. On February 16, 2020, he died at a hospital in Weston, Florida following complications with a stroke, pneumonia, and an induced coma.

See also
 List of Major League Baseball career hits leaders
 List of Major League Baseball career runs scored leaders
 List of Major League Baseball annual triples leaders
 List of Major League Baseball players to hit for the cycle

References

Citations

Sources

External links

1962 births
2020 deaths
Major League Baseball shortstops
Toronto Blue Jays players
San Diego Padres players
Cleveland Indians players
New York Yankees players
Cincinnati Reds players
New York Mets players
Milwaukee Brewers players
American League All-Stars
National League All-Stars
Gold Glove Award winners
Canadian Baseball Hall of Fame inductees
Major League Baseball players from the Dominican Republic
Dominican Republic expatriate baseball players in Canada
Dominican Republic expatriate baseball players in the United States
Dominican Republic expatriate baseball players in Japan
Seibu Lions players
Nippon Professional Baseball second basemen
Nippon Professional Baseball third basemen
Kinston Eagles players
Syracuse Chiefs players
Sportspeople from San Pedro de Macorís
Afro-Dominican (Dominican Republic)
Dominican Republic people of Haitian descent
Deaths from kidney disease